Agara  is a village in the southern state of Karnataka, India. It is located in the Yelandur taluk of Chamarajanagar district in Karnataka.

Noted people 
 Samsa - Kannada's first historical playwright, was born as A. N. Swamy Venkatadri Iyer  in Agara village.
 Agaram Rangaiah - freedom fighter and editor of Sadhvi paper for 63 years, was born in this village.

See also
 Chamarajanagar

References

External links
 http://Chamarajanagar.nic.in/

Villages in Chamarajanagar district